Solomon Seruya (1926 - 31 March 2015) was an Israeli-Gibraltarian politician and businessman.

He had an early political success in an election to the Gibraltar Legislative Council in 1956, when ten candidates contested seven seats. The winners were Joshua Hassan, Abraham Serfaty, J. E. Alcantara, and Albert Risso, all of the Association for the Advancement of Civil Rights, one Commonwealth Party candidate, Joseph Triay, and two Independents, Seruya and Peter Isola. Seruya went on to serve as Tourism and Ports Minister of Gibraltar.

In 1969 Seruya emigrated to Israel and lived in Jerusalem until 1983, serving in the United Israel Appeal and as ambassador to the Philippines. In 1981, he returned to Gibraltar to take over the family business, but in 2008 was reported to have kept a home in Jerusalem, where a daughter lives.

Seruya received the Spanish Grand Cross of Civil Merit award in 2008, "for his consistent calls for dialogue to resolve the status of Gibraltar, and because of his involvement in defending the interests of the Sephardic communities all over the world".

References

1926 births
2015 deaths
Gibraltarian Sephardi Jews
Gibraltarian politicians
Government ministers of Gibraltar
Jewish Gibraltarian politicians
Israeli diplomats
Israeli Sephardi Jews
Emigrants from the British Empire to Israel